Beneath the Texas Moon is the debut album by American country music artist J.C. Crowley. It was released in 1988 via RCA Records. The album includes the singles "Boxcar 109", "Paint the Town and Hang the Moon Tonight", "I Know What I've Got" and the title track.

Track listing

Chart performance

Singles

References

1988 debut albums
J.C. Crowley albums
RCA Records albums
Albums produced by Josh Leo